Diriba Kuma is an Ethiopian diplomat who was the 30th Mayor of Addis Ababa, who took office on 9 July 2013 until 16 July 2018. Diriba served as Minister of Transport before being elected as Mayor of Addis Ababa.
After his term as mayor, he was appointed as an ambassador to foreign countries by President Mulatu Teshome. Currently, he is an ambassador to Sweden as well as other Nordic countries.

References

Living people
Mayors of Addis Ababa
Year of birth missing (living people)
Government ministers of Ethiopia
21st-century Ethiopian politicians